Instant DeLIVEry is the third live album by the progressive rock band The Flower Kings. Recorded in Tilburg, Netherlands, on April 19, 2006, this album has live music from their tour promoting Paradox Hotel.

Track listing
All songs by Roine Stolt except where noted.

Disc One
 "Intro" – 2:27
 "Paradox Hotel" (Tomas Bodin, Stolt) – 5:55
 "Hit Me with a Hit" – 5:41
 "Last Minute on Earth" – 8:22
 "In the Eyes of the World" – 7:25
 "Jealousy" – 3:42
 "What If God Is Alone" (Hasse Fröberg, Jonas Reingold, Stolt) – 8:05
 "Pioneers of Aviation" – 12:23
 "Love Supreme" – 11:00
 "The Truth Will Set You Free" – 19:22

Disc Two
 "Touch My Heaven" (Bodin) – 7:34
 "Mommy Leave the Light On" – 6:52
 "End on a High Note" – 9:51
 "Life Will Kill You" (Fröberg) – 8:37
 "I Am the Sun" – 15:00
 "The Blade of Cain" – 5:29
 "A Kings Prayer" – 15:15
 "Stardust We Are" – 11:23

Personnel
Tomas Bodin - keyboards, vocals
Hasse Bruniusson - marimba, percussion
Hasse Fröberg - vocals, guitars
Marcus Liliequist - drums, percussion, vocals
Jonas Reingold - bass guitar, vocals
Roine Stolt - vocals, guitars

References

The Flower Kings albums
2006 live albums
Inside Out Music live albums
Inside Out Music video albums